General John Parslow (died 15 November 1786) was a British Army general of the 18th century.

Military career
Parslow served as a junior officer with the 1st Regiment of Foot Guards. He became colonel of the 70th (Glasgow Lowland) Regiment of Foot in April 1758, colonel of the 54th Regiment of Foot in September 1760 and colonel of the 30th Regiment of Foot in April 1770. He was promoted to full general on 20 November 1782.

He was Governor of Gibraltar from 1761 to 1762.

Family life
John Parslow married Margaret Hillersden, the daughter of the Whig MP for Bedford, William Hillersden, and his wife Elizabeth. Parslow's daughter Charlotte predeceased him on 11 June 1786.  Parslow himself died at the town of Bath on 15 November 1786.

References

|-

|-

British Army generals
1786 deaths
Year of birth unknown
British Army personnel of the Seven Years' War